This list of Australian Institute of Business alumni includes notable graduates.

Government, law and public policy

Sports

References

External links 
 Australian Institute of Business student and alumni network

Australian Institute of Business